The 2005 Euro Beach Soccer Cup was the seventh Euro Beach Soccer Cup, one of Europe's two major beach soccer championships at the time, held in December 2005, in Moscow, Russia.
Switzerland won the championship for the first time, with hosts Russia finishing second. Portugal beat Ukraine in the third place playoff to finish third and fourth respectively. This was the first time since the tournament's establishment that Portugal had failed to reach the final and the first time Spain had finished outside the top four.

Eight teams participated in the tournament who played in a straightforward knockout tournament, starting with the quarterfinals, with extra matches deciding the nations who finished in fifth, sixth, seventh and eighth place.

Participating nations

Matches

Main tournament

Fifth to eighth place deciding matches
The following matches took place between the losing nations in the quarterfinals to determine the final standings of the nations finishing in fifth to eighth place. The semifinals took place on the same day of the semifinals of the main tournament and the playoffs took place on the day of the final.

Winners

Final standings

References

Euro Beach Soccer Cup
2005 in beach soccer